Penstemon gracilentus is a species of penstemon known by the common names slender beardtongue and slender penstemon. It is native to the mountains and sagebrush plateau of northeastern California, western Nevada, and southern Oregon, where it grows in forest, woodland, and scrub habitat. It is a perennial herb producing upright branches to about 65 centimeters in maximum height, the stems developing woody bases. The leaves are up to 10 centimeters in length and linear or lance-shaped. The glandular inflorescence produces several tubular purple flowers up to 2 centimeters long. The mouth of each flower may be hairless or coated in long hairs, and the staminode usually has a coat of yellow hairs.

External links
Jepson Manual Treatment
Photo gallery

gracilentus
Flora of California
Flora of Nevada
Flora of Oregon
Flora without expected TNC conservation status